Paradrepanophorus is a genus of worms belonging to the family Paradrepanophoridae.

The species of this genus are found in Europe.

Species:

Paradrepanophorus corallinicola 
Paradrepanophorus crassus 
Paradrepanophorus nisidensis 
Paradrepanophorus obiensis 
Paradrepanophorus stephensoni

References

Nemerteans